The black ghost knifefish (Apteronotus albifrons) is a tropical fish belonging to the ghost knifefish family (Apteronotidae). They originate in freshwater habitats in South America where they range from Venezuela to the Paraguay–Paraná River, including the Amazon Basin. They are popular in aquaria. The fish is all black except for two white rings on its tail, and a white blaze on its nose, which can occasionally extend into a stripe down its back. It moves mainly by undulating a long fin on its underside.

Black ghost knifefish are nocturnal. They are a weakly electric fish which use an electric organ and receptors distributed over the length of their body in order to locate insect larvae.

The black ghost knifefish natively lives in fast moving, sandy bottom creeks in a tropical climate. South American natives believe that the ghosts of the departed take up residence in these fish, hence the name.

The black ghost knifefish is a weakly electric fish as a result of the electromotor and electrosensory systems it possesses. While some fish can only receive electric signals, the black ghost knifefish can both produce and sense the electrical impulses. Electrogenesis occurs when a specialized electric organ found in the tail of the fish generates electrical signals, which are thus called electric organ discharges (EODs). Then, for these EODs to be sensed by the fish, electroreception occurs when groups of sensory cells embedded in the skin, known as electroreceptor organs, detect the electrical change. The EODs are used for two major purposes: electrolocation and communication.

The kind of EOD produced can be used to distinguish between two types of weakly electric fish: the pulse-type and the wave-type. The black ghost knifefish are considered to be the latter type, because they can continuously generate EODs in small intervals. Wave-type EODs have a narrow power spectra, and can be heard as a tonal sound, where the discharge rate establishes the fundamental frequency. By emitting its own continuous sinusoidal train of EODs, the fish can determine the presence of nearby objects by sensing perturbations in timing and amplitude of electric fields, an ability known as active electrolocation. The particular organs used to sense the self-generated high-frequency EODs are tuberous electroreceptor organs. On the other hand, when low-frequency electric fields are generated by external sources instead of the fish itself, a different class of electroreceptor organs is used for this passive electrolocation, called ampullary organs. Therefore, the black ghost knifefish uses an active and a passive electrosystem, each with its own corresponding receptor organs. The fish can also use a mechanosensory lateral line system, which detects water disturbances created by the motion of the fish's body. As nocturnal hunters, the fish can rely on all three systems to navigate through dark environments and detect their prey.

Each species has a characteristic EOD baseline frequency range, which varies with sex and age within the species, as well. The baseline frequency is maintained to be almost constant at stable temperature, but will usually be changed due to the presence of others of the same species. Such changes in frequency relevant to social interaction are called frequency modulations (FMs). The role these FMs have in communication is significant, as black ghost knifefish have developed jamming avoidance responses, which are behavioral responses that avoid the overlapping of EOD frequencies between conspecific individuals to prevent sensory confusion. Moreover, a study was conducted that focused on sexual dimorphism in electrocommunication signals. Female black ghost knifefish generate EODs at a higher frequency than the males, an FM which can be used for gender recognition. A study found the subordinate black ghost knifefish exhibited noticeable gradual frequency rises (GFRs) in their EODs whereas the dominant fish did not, supporting the researchers' hypothesis that GFRs during communication are indicative of submissive signals.

It is possible to use a device to convert a captive fish's electrical signals into audible sound, allowing listeners to hear the fish "talk". The Bakken Museum in Minneapolis has a display with such a device and a black ghost knifefish.

References
.

Further reading 
 MacIver M. A., Patankar N. A. & Shirgaonkar A. A. (2010). "Energy-Information Trade-Offs between Movement and Sensing". PLoS Computational Biology 6(5): e1000769.

External links

 Ikan Black Ghost

 The MacIver Lab Homepage
 Black Ghost Knife Fish, Apteronotus albifrons (Linnaeus, 1766).BdFISH
 

black ghost knifefish
Fish of Venezuela
Fish of the Amazon basin
black ghost knifefish
Taxa named by Carl Linnaeus